The kulintang a tiniok is a type of Philippine metallophone with eight tuned knobbed metal plates strung together via string a top a wooden antangan (rack). Kulintang a tiniok is a Maguindanaon term meaning "kulintang with string," but they also could call them kulintang a putao, meaning "kulintang of metal." The Maranao refer to this instrument as a sarunay (or salunay, salonay, saronay, saronai or sarunai), terminology which has become popular for this instrument in North America. This is considered a relatively recent instrument and surprisingly many of them are only made of tin-can. Like the kulintang a kayo, it is used only for self-entertainment purpose in the home, to train beginners on new songs before using the kulintang and in America, master artists have been training students en masse on these instruments.

References

See also
Metallophone

Kulintang
Philippine musical instruments
Keyboard percussion instruments
Plaque percussion idiophones